"Through Glass" is the second single from the rock band Stone Sour's second album Come What(ever) May. It reached the number one spot on the Billboard Hot Mainstream Rock Tracks chart in the US, where it remained for seven weeks, and number two on the Alternative Songs chart. The song also peaked at number 39 on the Billboard Hot 100 after crossing over to pop radio. It remains their most popular song to date. The single's cover features the band's hometown of Des Moines, Iowa. On March 3, 2017, "Through Glass" was certified platinum by the RIAA.

Background
The song was originally inspired by frontman Corey Taylor's outrage at the music industry and how he felt that the musical revolution had never taken place. Taylor was quoted as having said:

Years later, Taylor elaborated on the origins of the song, saying that he watched so much European music television because he was suffering from food poisoning in Sweden and was unable to move and change the channel from MTV Europe.

Music video
The music video for "Through Glass" was shot with director Tony Petrossian and included a cameo by Poison guitarist C.C. Deville. The video begins with Corey Taylor singing the intro while sitting in a chair. He gets up to reveal that the video is taking place at a house party, and it subsequently goes through close-ups of the guests. A shot of a waitress bringing a plate of a plywood cutout of food is also shown. As the video progresses, the band begins to perform in front of the Hollywood Sign, spelled as "Hollowood". Taylor walks through a pool and sings the rest of the song. Two men are shown to actually be plywood cutouts, which are then taken away. Another set of people are also plywood cutouts who are then taken away. As the video continues, the whole set is shown to be made up of plywood cutouts, which are taken away. When the band finishes, they walk away, revealing that the place in which they were performing was also made of plywood cutouts.

Track listing

Chart positions

Weekly charts

Year-end charts

Certifications

In popular culture
The song was featured in the 2012 horror film Grave Encounters 2.

References

2006 singles
2006 songs
Stone Sour songs
Rock ballads
Songs about music
Music videos directed by Tony Petrossian
Songs written by Corey Taylor
Songs written by Shawn Economaki
Songs written by Josh Rand
Songs written by Jim Root
Song recordings produced by Nick Raskulinecz